The 1957 Nevada Wolf Pack football team represented the University of Nevada during the 1957 NCAA College Division football season. Nevada competed as a member of the Far Western Conference (FWC). The Wolf Pack were led by third-year head coach Gordon McEachron and played their home games at Mackay Stadium.

Schedule

References

Nevada
Nevada Wolf Pack football seasons
Nevada Wolf Pack football